Rene Van de Walle (born 1924; died 2009) was an Old Testament Scholar hailing from the Society of Jesus.  Van de Walle contributed to scholarly research through his writings which appeared in the major theological journals in India for nearly two decades.

Van de Walle was Professor of Old Testament at the De Nobili College (Papal Seminary), Pune and was associated with the revision of Marathi Bible produced by the Bible Society of India.

Writings
 1965, An Administrative Body of Priests and a Consecrated People, 
 1967, Welcome address at the biennial of the Society for Biblical Studies in India,
 1969, The sin in the garden and the sinfulness of the world,
 1975, Jesus - Christ of Atonement or Christ The New Man?,
 1975, The Prophets' Call for Renewal and Reconciliation,
 1978, (co-translated with Christopher T. Begg), Parables of Jesus.  Insight and Challenge
 1978, Death and beyond in the sapiential literature,
 1981, Israel's Relations with the Nations,
 1983, Esther and Judith, Two Valiant Women,
 1986, The Various Facets of Man in Wisdom Literature,
 1986, Wisdom,
 1989, The Minor Prophets as Conscientizers,
 No date, A comparative study on Psalm 139 and Hymn IV, 16 of Atharvaveda,

References

20th-century Belgian Roman Catholic theologians
Academic staff of the Senate of Serampore College (University)
Old Testament scholars
Indian biblical scholars
20th-century Belgian Jesuits
1924 births
2009 deaths